Eden Studios was a commercial recording facility in west London. It opened in 1967, originally at 11 Eden Street in Kingston upon Thames (now under the Eden Walk shopping centre), before moving to 20-24 Beaumont Road in Chiswick in 1972. It was started by Philip Love, Mike Gardner and Piers Ford-Crush. Love and Gardner owned the studio and worked there as financial and technical directors, respectively. Ford-Crush retired in 1998. The studio closed in July 2007 and the Chiswick site was demolished for housing.

Notable artists who have worked at Eden Studios include:

 Amaral
 Richard Ashcroft
 Bay City Rollers
 John Cale
 Elvis Costello
 The Darkness
 Dubstar
 Elbow
 Girls Aloud
 Happy Mondays
 John Hiatt
 The Icarus Line
 Joe Jackson
 Jamelia
 Tom Jones
 Joy Division
 Kaiser Chiefs
 Kissing the Pink (KTP)
 KT Tunstall
 Nigel Kennedy
 The Killers
 Kroke
 Nick Lowe
 Madness
 McFly
 George Michael
 Kylie Minogue
 Oasis
 The Ocean Blue
 Patti Smith (Gung Ho)
 Primal Scream
 Rockpile
 Sex Pistols
 The Sinceros
 The Smiths
 Shakin' Stevens
 Sugababes
 The Undertones
 The La's

References

External links 

 Video tour around Eden Studios in 2001

  

Recording studios in London
Demolished buildings and structures in London